Baron Klaus Eriksson Fleming (1535 in Pargas – 13 April 1597 in Pohja) was a Finnish-born member of the Swedish nobility and admiral, who played an important role in Finnish and Swedish history during the rise of Sweden as a Great Power. He was a trustee of kings John III and Sigismund Vasa. His wife was Ebba Stenbock.

Biography

Fleming's father – a grandson of Björn Ragvaldsson – was the Councilor of State Erik Fleming (1487–1548), also a remarkable man and King Gustav Vasa's favourite.

In 1569 Fleming became a member of the Privy Council, in 1571 he was made Lord High Admiral and in 1590 Lord High Constable. As the Governor of Finland and Estonia he carried the duties of the highest authority of Finland and Estonia for the Swedish realm, next only to the king. He was a strong supporter of the legitimate king of Sweden and Poland Sigismund Vasa and therefore an enemy of Sigismund's paternal uncle, duke Charles of Sudermania, who had also laid claim to the Swedish throne. He subdued rebels of the Cudgel War in 1596–97. A civil war against Charles was however on the horizon.

While his fleet was being prepared at Siuntio in April 1597, he suddenly fell sick. Nevertheless choosing to travel to meet his wife at Perniö, he died somewhere near the church of Pohja during the night of 12-13 April. His body was taken to Turku, which Charles IX conquered that August. Fleming's sons were executed in the Åbo Bloodbath of 1599.

When studying Swedish history of the time it is noteworthy to know there were many persons in similar position with the name Clas Fleming at the time. Clas Eriksson Flemming should not be confused with Clas Larsson Fleming (1592–1644), admiral and advisor to the king, or Klas Fleming (1649–1685), nobleman and politician.

See also
Fleming of Louhisaari
Club War
War against Sigismund

References

External links

|-

1535 births
1597 deaths
People from Pargas
Swedish-speaking Finns
Field marshals of Finland
Swedish Governors-General of Finland
Finnish admirals
Finnish Privy Councillors
Finnish politicians
16th-century Swedish politicians
16th-century Finnish nobility
16th-century Swedish nobility
Governors-General of Sweden
Members of the Privy Council of Sweden
People of the War against Sigismund
16th-century Swedish military personnel